The Tanfield Railway is a   heritage railway in Gateshead and County Durham, England. Running on part of a former horse-drawn colliery wooden waggonway, later rope & horse, lastly rope & loco railway. It operates preserved industrial steam locomotives. The railway operates a passenger service every Sunday, plus other days, as well as occasional demonstration coal, goods and mixed trains. The line runs  between a southern terminus at East Tanfield, Durham, to a northern terminus at Sunniside, Gateshead. Another station, Andrews House, is situated near the Marley Hill engine shed. A halt also serves the historic site of the Causey Arch. The railway claims it is "the world's oldest railway" because it runs on a section dating from 1725, other parts being in use since 1621.

The railway is run by three bodies: "Friends of Tanfield Railway", "Tanfield Railway Trust" which owns the railway, the locomotives and rolling stock and "The Tanfield Railway Company" which operates the railway.

"The Tanfield Railway Company" is split into four departments; each has a manager and director: Engineering who maintain locomotives, Operations including drivers and guards, Carriage & Waggon who preserve carriages, and Commercial which operates shops, events and the passenger side of operations.

Colliery railway 

The Tanfield Waggonway was built by the Grand Allies, an association of coal-owning families, including the Bowes, Liddells, Ords and Montagues, who joined together to overcome wayleave difficulties from about 1720. Its purpose was to transport coal more reliably and cheaply from the inland collieries of County Durham to the staiths on the River Tyne at Redheugh.  From there the coal was transported in keels downriver to Shields, then transferred to colliers (bulk coal carrying ships) for the voyage down the North Sea coast to south east England.  Many older shorter coal waggonways existed to the north of the present heritage line, in the Whickham and Lobley Hill areas, but the Tanfield Waggonway was a much longer and heavily engineered route which gave the Grand Allies market dominance all year round.   (Although supply to SE England was still subject to North Sea winters.)  The Tanfield route was in continuous use from 1725 until final closure in 1964.

The route and structures of the oldest section of the now preserved part of the line, between Sunniside and Causey, dates from 1725, and is thus the world's oldest railway still in operation.
(The Middleton Railway makes an alternative claim to be the oldest railway, as the first railway granted powers under the first railway Act of Parliament in 1758.) The Causey to East Tanfield section was built in 1839.

The Marley Hill engine shed was built by 1854, and was in industrial use until 1970. The shed is on the Bowes Railway, whereas locos used on the Tanfield branch were stabled at the nearby Bowes Bridge MPD (a sub-shed of Gateshead), the coaling ramp and turntable pit of which are still visible adjacent to the track between Andrews House and Sunniside. A winding engine occupied the Bowes Bridge site from 1840–81, a locomotive shed from 1881-1962. The headshunt by Marley Hill signal box is the point where the west-east Bowes Railway crossed the south-north Tanfield branch. When the Tanfield Railway began running trains in 1977 a curve was installed to allow Marley Hill locos and trains onto the Tanfield Branch.  Marley Hill engine shed is the oldest in the world still used for its original function.  As collieries on the NCB line closed in the 1960s, coal was brought by road to adjacent drops for onward rail transport, and the shed saw further use servicing other local colliery locomotives.

Originally a wooden railed horse drawn waggonway, conversion to a steel railed railway began in 1837, and by 1840 was complete as far as Tanfield Moor Colliery, using stationary steam engines, gravity inclines and horses.   In 1881, while operated by the North Eastern Railway, steam locomotives replaced the stationary steam engines and horses. Although primarily a coal railway, it did carry some passengers.  The railway closed when the last colliery on the line at East Tanfield ceased production in 1964.

Preservation 

The early years of the railway as a preservation project concentrated on Marley Hill, preparing locos for steaming, working on the shed structure and acquiring basic needs such as water and electricity. Locomotives No.21 (Robert Stephenson and Hawthorns engine of 1954 0-4-0st) and No.5 (Malleable) were steamed in public in 1973. The first passenger train ran for a week August 1975, using locomotives No.21, No.32 and Sir Cecil A Cochrane, and a small carriage acquired from the British Steel Corporation site at Teesside.

The preserved line was first built from Marley Hill to the current northern terminus, Sunniside Station, with passenger trains beginning on 2 July 1981, and an official opening ceremony on 14 July 1982. Andrews House station just south of Marley Hill sheds was completed between 1987 and 1989 and was equipped with platforms, a water tower, a station building and a footbridge. The first train south to Causey was on 27 July 1991, with the official opening ceremony being held on 15 August 1991. The first train further south to the current end of the line at East Tanfield occurred on 18 October 1992. East Tanfield Station itself was opened in 1997. The Causey to Tanfield section is through a wood lined gorge.

Part of the reason the line was preserved was the fact Marley Hill shed remained open until 1970. The vintage machinery in the workshop is still capable of full locomotive overhauls. The oldest locomotive on the railway was built in Gateshead in 1873, and all of the railway's carriage stock dates from the 19th Century.

Causey Arch 

The current preserved line passes near to Causey Arch, the oldest surviving railway bridge in the world. It was built to carry a new branch from the route of the now preserved line to a site known as Dawson's Drift.

Locations

Steam locomotives 

As of 2017, the railway has become the home to a large collection of industrial steam engines, with 28 in all, though only three are operational. One is undergoing repairs and three more are under overhaul for future operation, with the other 21 around the Marley Hill site.

Operational locomotives

Locomotives under overhaul/restoration

Stored locomotives

Diesel and electric locomotives 

 AEG Bo-BoBo-BoWE no. 1565 / NCB No.9, built in 1913 for the Harton Coal Company. Withdrawn in 1988. On display in Marley Hill Yard. Awaiting cosmetic restoration in the future.
 Andrew Barclay Sons & Co. 0-6-0DH no. 615, built in 1977. Operational, on hire to the Aln Valley Railway.
 Armstrong Whitworth  no. D22, built in 1933. Operational.
 English Electric and Baguley 2-2wDHR no. 3565, built in 1962. On display.
 F.C. Hibberd & Co Ltd Planet 4wDM no. 3716, built in 1955. Operational.
 Fowler 0-6-0DH no. 4240010 No. 6, built in 1960. Undergoing restoration.
 Hawthorn Leslie 4w-4wBE no. 3872 Derek Shepherd, built in 1936. On display.
 Hunslet Engine Company 0-6-0DH no. 6612 No. 501, built in 1965. Stored awaiting restoration.
 Robert Stephenson and Hawthorns 0-4-0DM no. 6980 Camel, built in 1940. On display.
 Robert Stephenson and Hawthorns 0-6-0DM no. 7697 Beryl, built in 1953. On display.
 Robert Stephenson and Hawthorns 0-6-0DM no. 7746 Bromborough No. 2, built in 1954. On display.
 Robert Stephenson and Hawthorns 0-4-0DM no. 7901 Husky, built in 1958. Operational.
 Robert Stephenson and Hawthorns Bo-BoWE no. 7078 Kearsley No. 3, built in 1944. On display.
 Ruston and Hornsby 0-4-0DE no. 418600 T.I.C No. 35, built in 1958. On display.
 Siemens 4wWE no. 862 / NCB No.10, built in 1913. Sister locomotive to NCB No.9 (see above). On display, cosmetically restored.

Key
 BE = battery-electric
 DE = diesel-electric
 DH = diesel-hydraulic
 DM = diesel-mechanical
 WE = overhead wire electric

Coaching stock 

All of the railways coaches are wooden bodied, Victorian coaches.

 TR No.1 Open Balcony Coach ex GWR Van
 TR No.2 Open Balcony Coach ex GWR van
 TR No.3 Open Coach with Guards Van eX LNER Ballast brake van
 TR No.4 Open Coach with Guards Van ex LNER Ballast brake van
 TR No.5 Compartment Coach. Originally a GNR Coach
 TR No.6 Compartment Coach. Originally a GNR Coach
 TR No.7 Open Poppleton Coach with Guards Van. Originally an NER Director's Saloon
 TR No.8 Compartment Coach with Guards Van. Originally an MS&L Brake Van
 NER No.256 Compartment Coach built 1878
 NER No.818 Compartment Coach
NER No.A15 Compartment bogie carriage

The railway also has other unrestored coaching stock.

Additional photographs

References

Further reading 

 The Tanfield Railway (Causey Extension) Light Railway Order 1991
 History of the Tanfield Wagonway Sunniside Local History Society

External links 

 Official site
 Tanfield Railway photo gallery BBC Wear
 The Grand Allies Co-Curate (Newcastle University)

Heritage railways in County Durham
Heritage railways in Tyne and Wear
Museums in County Durham
Railway museums in England
Horse-drawn railways
Railway lines opened in 1725
1725 establishments in Great Britain
1647 establishments in England